Phragmataecia gurkoi is a species of moth of the family Cossidae. It is found in north-western Pakistan.

The length of the forewings is about 13 mm. The forewings are ochreous with a suffusion of grey scales in the form of stripes. The hindwings are white.

References

Moths described in 2007
Phragmataecia